Sivalenka Sambhu Prasad (26 January 1911 – 8 June 1972)  was a journalist and Indian National Congress politician, who took over the Daily News Paper Andhra Patrika (Daily Telugu language Newspaper), Andhra Sachitra Vara Patrika (Telugu Language Weekly Magazine) and Bharathi (Telugu Language Monthly covering classical Literature)  which were published from Chennai City (then Madras) which was the capital of Composite State of Madras (Madras Presidency) from his father-in-law Kasinadhuni Nageswara Rao, the founder of Andhra Patrika group of publications in 1903, inventor of "Amrutanjan", a pain balm with natural ingredients, in 1893 and a freedom-fighter. After taking over he led the group of publications from 1938 to 1972. Rao also bequeathed all properties and Amrutanjan business to Sambhu Prasad, which he ran along with publications. During Sambhu Prasad's lifetime there were many important events in India, including the Second World War, the Independence of India, and much of the life, and the death, of Mahatma Gandhi. He was called "Ayyavaru" (Teacher and Guru) by his employees.
The centenary of his birth was celebrated in 2011 by a function was attended by dignitaries and journalists, including Chief Minister of Andhra Pradesh Konijeti Rosaiah.

Early life 
Sambhu Prasad was born to S. Sivabrahmam in the then Madras Presidency. He graduated from the Viswa Bharathi University and joined the Indian independence movement. He was a member of the Indian National Congress.

Education 
Sivalenka Sambhuprasad graduated from the Santiniketan school founded by Rabindranath Tagore.

Member of Parliament 
Sambhu Prasad was elected to the Rajya Sabha in 1952 and served from 3 April 1952 to 2 April 1956. He subsequently served a term in the Legislative Council of Andhra Pradesh States.

Family 
Sambhu Prasad married Kamakshamma (daughter of Kasinadhuni Nageswara Rao Desodharaka Nageswara Rao Pantulu Garu). They had two sons and three daughters.

First Son Sivalenka Radhakrishna ;
First Daughter Leela Bhramara ( born in 1935- named in memory of Sambhu Prasad's Teacher in Shantiniketan School Smt Leela Mazumdar and Sambhu Prasad's mother Smt Bhramaramba, Married to Digavalli Sitarama Rao Son of Digavalli Subba Rao, the then Head of Medical Department of Andhra State;
Second Daughter Nageswaramma( born in 1938- named in memory of the maternal grandfather Kasinadhuni Nageswara Rao and Father in law of Sambhu Prasad and Founder of Andhra Patrika Publications and Amrutanjan as she was born on the same night Kasinadhuni Nageswara Rao died in 1938. Married to Pasumarthi Satyanarayana Murthy, son of Pasumarthi Sivaprasada Vekat Rao )   
Third Daughter Sivalenka Ramayamma ( named in memory of Maternal Grandmother Smt Ramayamma and wife of  Kasinadhuni Nageswara Rao)   
(Second Son)Sivalenka Nageswara Rao (Named In Memory of Maternal Grandfather  Kasinadhuni Nageswara Rao)

Death 

 Sambhu Prasad died on Thursday 8 June 1972 at Chennai.

References

External links 
 

1911 births
1972 deaths
Indian National Congress politicians from Tamil Nadu
Lok Sabha members from Tamil Nadu